Wynn R. Schwartz (born 1950) is an American clinical and experimental psychologist, research psychoanalyst, best known for his work on the Person Concept and his contributions to Descriptive psychology.

Background
Wynn Schwartz did his undergraduate work at Duke University and holds a doctorate from the University of Colorado, Boulder obtained under the supervision of Peter G. Ossorio, and trained as a research psychoanalyst at the Boston Psychoanalytic Society and Institute. His conceptual work on empathy provides an ordinary language understanding  of empathy as a feature of I-Thou relationships and ordinary social interactions.  His experiments with hypnosis have helped clarify how some hypnotic inductions with certain subjects create a temporary disruption in episodic memory and undermine reality testing. His experiments with dreams have contributed to an understanding of the manner in which dream cognition is connected to a person's basic everyday  concerns shaped by the individual's personality and current preoccupations.

Professor Schwartz served on the core faculty of Massachusetts School of Professional Psychology, and teaches at Harvard Medical School and the Harvard Extension School. He has taught at Wellesley College, the Boston Psychoanalytic Society and Institute, and the Massachusetts Institute of Psychoanalysis.  Much of his psychoanalytic work involves an application of Descriptive Psychology.

On empathy
"We recognize others as empathic when we feel that they have accurately acted on or somehow acknowledged in stated or unstated fashion our values or motivations, our knowledge, and our skills or competence, but especially as they appear to recognize the significance of our actions in a manner that we can tolerate their being recognized."

Schwartz (2008) suggests people are empathic when they recognize another person's intentions, actions, personal characteristics, and psychological states and communicate that recognition to the other in an accurate and tolerable manner.  An empathic recognition of another's behavior can include actions that the observed claims or disowns. According to Schwartz, a therapeutic interpretation of a disowned or unconsciously motivated action recognizes that people take it that things are as they seem to them unless they have sufficient reason to think otherwise and that the therapist's task is to tactfully build the case that things might not be as they seem to the client.   When empathically interpreting behaviour, a therapist offers an interpretation that the client can accept or reject, since the therapist acknowledges that useful interpretations are subject to ongoing negotiation and revision.  Although accurate empathic interpretations can take an infinite variety of forms, they must be useful, tolerable, and fit the person's possible self-understanding.  In psychoanalysis, the therapist attempts an empathic interpretation of transference and resistance.

On psychoanalysis
Schwartz is noted for his role in clarifying the theory and practice of psychoanalysis in ordinary pragmatic language from the perspective of Descriptive Psychology and for his work in psychoanalytic approaches to dream psychology.

Representative publications
Schwartz, W. (2019) Descriptive Psychology and the Person Concept (Academic Press-Elsevier)
Schwartz, W. (2013) The Parameters of Empathy: Core considerations for psychotherapy and supervision. Advances in Descriptive Psychology
Schwartz, W. (2010) On saying "no": Evidence based practice and the hijacking of the empirical. Advances in Descriptive Psychology

R Greenberg, C Pearlman, W Schwartz. (1997) Using the Rorschach to Define Differences in Schizophrenics and the Implications for Treatment. J. Am. Psychoanal. Assoc.
Schwartz, W. (1993) Problem Representation in Dreams. The Kekulé riddle: a challenge for chemists and psychologists,  Glenview Press.
Greenberg, R., Katz, H., Schwartz, W., Pearlman, C. (1992)  A Research-Based Reconsideration of the psychoanalytic theory of Dreams  J. Am. Psychoanal. Assoc.
Schwartz, W. (1990) A psychoanalytic approach to dreamwork — Dreamtime and Dreamwork: Decoding the language of the Night
Schwartz, W., Godwyn, M. (1988) Action and representation in ordinary and lucid dreams. Conscious Mind, Sleeping Brain: Perspectives on Lucid Dreams
Schwartz, W. (1984)The two concepts of action and responsibility in psychoanalysis. Journal of the American Psychoanalytic Association
Plotkin, W., Schwartz, W. (1982) A conceptualization of hypnosis: Exploring the place of appraisal and anomaly in behavior and experience. Advances in Descriptive Psychology
Schwartz, W. (1982) The problem of other possible persons: Dolphins, primates, and aliens. Advances in Descriptive Psychology
R Greenberg, C Pearlman, W Schwartz (1983) Memory, emotion, and REM sleep. J Abnorm Psychology
Schwartz, W. (1980) Hypnosis and episodic memory. International Journal of Clinical and Experimental Hypnosis
Schwartz, W. (1979) Degradation, accreditation, and rites of passage. Psychiatry.
Schwartz, W. (1978) Time and context during hypnotic involvement. International Journal of Clinical and Experimental Hypnosis

References

External links

Freedom, Liberation, and Reaction: Lessons in Psychology
The Society for Descriptive Psychology
Wynn Schwartz, Ph.D.

1950 births
Living people
American psychoanalysts
21st-century American psychologists
Harvard Extension School faculty
20th-century American psychologists